The Holiday Overture is a composition for orchestra by Elliott Carter. Carter wrote the work during the summer of 1944, on commission from the Boston Symphony Orchestra, to celebrate the liberation of Paris during World War II. In addition, Carter composed the overture for the Independent Concert Music Publisher's Contest 1945, and won this competition. The overture was to have been premiered in Boston. However, Carter made a copy of some parts of the work. Eventually, the work received its premiere in Frankfurt in 1946, conducted by Hans Blümer. In 1961, Carter revised the overture.

Background
The music is optimistic in spirit, reflecting Carter's own affection for his years in Paris and reaction to news of the Allied victory in France. Whilst reminiscent of the populist manner of Aaron Copland, according to the composer himself, the work was also one of his first to use "different contrasting layers of musical activity at the same time". In addition, Carter has said of the work:

... it was to be a demonstration of brilliant orchestration, and a lively, good-spirited sort of piece.

The music has a duration of about 10 minutes. The instrumentation is as follows:

Recordings
 CRI SD 475: American Composers Orchestra; Paul Lustig Dunkel, conductor
 Naxos 8.559151: Nashville Symphony Orchestra; Kenneth Schermerhorn, conductor (recorded 2002)
 Bridge Records 9177: Odense Symphony Orchestra; Donald Palma, conductor
 Testament SBT 1516: Berlin Philharmonic; Aaron Copland, conductor (recorded live in September 30, 1970)

References

External links
 Naxos 8.559151, CD Booklet P.2 and 3, with link to notes by Frank J. Oteri
 Liner notes to CRI Recording of Elliott Carter's music, NWCR610
 , Nashville Symphony, Kenneth Schermerhorn conducting (2004)

Compositions by Elliott Carter
1944 compositions
Concert overtures
Music commissioned by the Boston Symphony Orchestra